The David X. Marks Tennis Stadium is a tennis facility located on the campus of the University of Southern California in Los Angeles. The facility, built in 1971, serves as the home of the USC Trojans men's and women's tennis teams. The facility provides six outdoor tennis courts and has a seating capacity of 1,000. The stadium is named for David X. Marks, a World War I pilot.

Renovations
In 2015, The Buntmann Family Tennis Center was added and includes a new entrance and lobby. The renovation included suites with lockers, showers, team meeting rooms and lounges. The renovation also included a new training room, storage area and large multi-purpose room. In 2005, a new LED scoreboard was installed. In 2002, 700 chair-back seats were added replacing bleacher seating.

Events
The 1974 men’s NCAA Tennis Tournament was held at the stadium.

Gallery

References

External links
David X. Marks Tennis Stadium at usctrojans.com

College tennis venues in the United States
Tennis venues in Los Angeles
USC Trojans men's tennis
USC Trojans women's tennis
USC Trojans sports venues
Sports venues completed in 1971
1971 establishments in California